Charming Snakes is an album by the English musician Andy Summers. It was released in 1990. Summers supported the album by opening the 1991 Montreal International Jazz Festival; he also played shows with John McLaughlin.

Production
The album was produced by Summers and David Hentschel. "Monk Gets Ripped" is a tribute to Thelonious Monk. Herbie Hancock played on "Innocence Falls Prey" and "Big Thing". Sting played bass on the title track. Bill Evans played saxophone on many of the tracks.

Critical reception

The Calgary Herald wrote that "the shift to jazz from rock continues," and praised the "vibrant, fluid guitar." The Washington Post determined that "Summers has progressed from the mood noodlings of his earlier solo recordings to solidly structured and arranged pieces." The Dallas Morning News concluded that "this time out, he eschews most of his synthpop inclinations and puts himself in a studio of consummate session players ... This nearly traditional jazz format results in his most lyrical instrumental album so far."

The Vancouver Sun noted that "the guitar is a little more frenetic, the bass faster paced, with strong jazz influences." The Gazette lamented that "Summers couldn't write a catchy melody to save his life."

AllMusic called the album "a strong jazz-rock statement," writing that "Summers's guitar covers the spectrum from in-your-face wailing leads to subtle background colorings, with much use of electronic effects." MusicHound Rock: The Essential Album Guide considered it "Summers's first and best turn from ambient rock guitar noise to artful jazz fusion."

Track listing

References

Andy Summers albums
1990 albums
Private Music albums